John Mountford may refer to:

John Mountford (broadcaster) (born 1949), a British television executive and former broadcaster
John Mountford (politician) (1933–2022), a former member of the Australian House of Representatives